Charles P. Freeman (born 1947) is an English historian specializing in the history of ancient Greece and Rome. He is the author of numerous books on the ancient world including The Closing of the Western Mind: The Rise of Faith and the Fall of Reason. He has taught courses on ancient history in Cambridge's Adult Education program and is a Historical Consultant to the Blue Guides. He also leads cultural study tours to Italy, Greece, and Turkey. In 2003, he was elected a Fellow of the Royal Society of Arts.

Early life and education
From an early age Freeman was passionate about history and spent his school holidays helping on archeological digs run by Ipswich Museum. He studied law at Trinity College, Cambridge, and after graduation spent a year teaching in Sudan.

He also holds a master's degree in African history and politics from the School of Oriental and African Studies at the University of London and an additional master's degree in applied research in education from the University of East Anglia.

In 1978 he was appointed head of history at St. Clare's, Oxford, an international sixth form college and spent ten years there.  He spent thirty years in total as a teacher and examiner/senior examiner with the International Baccalaureate. From 1988 he has worked full-time as a professional freelance historian.

Personal life
Charles Freeman lives in Suffolk near Framlingham, England, with his second wife Lydia; between them they have seven children.

Publications
The World of the Romans: Illustrated Encyclopedia of World History. 1993, Oxford University Press.
Egypt, Greece and Rome: Civilizations of the Ancient Mediterranean. 1996. Third edition-2014.
The Legacy of Ancient Egypt. 1997, Facts on File/Checkmark Books
The Greek Achievement: The Foundation of the Western World. 1999	
The Closing of the Western Mind: The Rise of Faith and the Fall of Reason. Published October 7, 2003
A.D. 381: Heretics, Pagans, and the Dawn of the Monotheistic State. 2009.
A New History of Early Christianity. 2009.
Sites of Antiquity: From Ancient Egypt to the Fall of Rome, 50 Sites that Explain the Classical World. 2009
The Horses of St. Mark's: A Story of Triumph in Byzantium, Paris, and Venice.  2010
Holy Bones, Holy Dust: How Relics Shaped the History of Medieval Europe. 2011
The Reopening of the Western Mind. 2020

References

External links
 Charles Freeman at YaleBooks

1947 births
Alumni of SOAS University of London
Alumni of the University of East Anglia
Alumni of Trinity College, Cambridge
English historians
Historians of ancient Greece
Historians of ancient Rome
Living people
Scholars of ancient Greek history